Fight Club 3 is Chuck Palahniuk's second comic book meta-sequel to his 1996 novel Fight Club.

Fight Club 3 consists of twelve issues, with the first issue being released January 30, 2019.

Plot
Marla Singer is about to deliver her second child, but the father isn't her husband, it is his alter ego Tyler Durden.

References

Dark Horse Comics titles
2019 comics debuts
Fight Club
Works by Chuck Palahniuk